Florala City Park, formerly Florala State Park, is a  public recreation area in Florala, Alabama. The park wraps around the Alabama side of Lake Jackson, a  lake that straddles the Alabama-Florida state line.

History
The park was established in the early 1900s and was a city-run facility in 1909. Management was turned over to the state in 1971. The park reverted to local ownership in 2015 after the state closed five of its 22 state parks in response to funding issues.

Activities and amenities
The park offers boating, fishing, swimming, picnicking, and camping. Facilities include a 200-foot pier, picnic pavilions, a walking trail to Florala City Wetlands Park, and the  Rodney J. Evans Conference Center and Amphitheater.

References

External links
Lake Jackson RV Park at Florala Alabama Department of Conservation and Natural Resources

Parks in Alabama
Protected areas of Covington County, Alabama
Protected areas established in 1909
1909 establishments in Alabama